Glaphyrarcha is a genus of moths in the family Carposinidae. It contains only one species Glaphyrarcha euthrepta. This species is endemic to New Zealand.

Taxonomy 
G. euthrepta was described by Edward Meyrick in 1938 using material collected at Arthur's Pass by Mr R. Scott. George Hudson discussed and illustrated this species in his 1939 book A supplement to the butterflies and moths of New Zealand. The holotype specimen is held at the Canterbury Museum.

Description 
G. euthrepta has a wingspan of about 43 mm. The head, palpi and thorax are ochreous-brown and the face is pale ochreous. The forewings are very elongate-triangular, the costa moderately arched, the apex obtuse and the termen rather obliquely rounded. They are brownish-ochreous with some scattered extremely minute fuscous specks. There is a short fuscous darker-irrorated (sprinkled) streak running along the base of the costa and a small dark fuscous dot in the disc. There is also a fuscous dot at end of the cell and two or three indistinct dots of dark fuscous irroration towards the termen in the middle as well as a terminal series of indistinct dark fuscous dots or marks. The hindwings and cilia are grey-whitish.

Distribution 
G. euthrepta is endemic to New Zealand. It has been collected at Arthur's Pass.

Biology and behaviour 
This species is attracted to light and the holotype was originally collected by Scott after it entered his house at night. G. euthrepta is on the wing in early November. G. euthrepta has a typical carposinid posture at rest with its wings scarcely overlapping and held largely flat.

References

External links

 Holotype specimen of Glaphyrarcha euthrepta held at the Canterbury Museum

Carposinidae
Moths of New Zealand
Endemic fauna of New Zealand
Moths described in 1938
Taxa named by Edward Meyrick
Endemic moths of New Zealand
Monotypic moth genera